Cluster headache (CH) is a neurological disorder characterized by recurrent severe headaches on one side of the head, typically around the eye(s). There is often accompanying eye watering, nasal congestion, or swelling around the eye on the affected side. These symptoms typically last 15 minutes to 3 hours. Attacks often occur in clusters which typically last for weeks or months and occasionally more than a year.

The cause is unknown. Risk factors include a history of exposure to tobacco smoke and a family history of the condition. Exposures which may trigger attacks include alcohol, nitroglycerin, and histamine. They are a primary headache disorder of the trigeminal autonomic cephalalgias type. Diagnosis is based on symptoms.

Recommended management includes lifestyle adaptations such as avoiding potential triggers. Treatments for acute attacks include oxygen or a fast-acting triptan. Measures recommended to decrease the frequency of attacks include steroid injections, civamide, or verapamil. Nerve stimulation or surgery may occasionally be used if other measures are not effective.

The condition affects about 0.1% of the general population at some point in their life and 0.05% in any given year. The condition usually first occurs between 20 and 40 years of age. Men are affected about four times more often than women. Cluster headaches are named for the occurrence of groups of headache attacks (clusters). They have also been referred to as "suicide headaches".

Signs and symptoms
Cluster headaches are recurring bouts of severe unilateral headache attacks. The duration of a typical CH attack ranges from about 15 to 180 minutes. About 75% of untreated attacks last less than 60 minutes. However, females may have longer and more severe CH.

The onset of an attack is rapid and typically without an aura. Preliminary sensations of pain in the general area of attack, referred to as "shadows", may signal an imminent CH, or these symptoms may linger after an attack has passed, or between attacks. Though CH is strictly unilateral, there are some documented cases of "side-shift" between cluster periods, or, rarely, simultaneous (within the same cluster period) bilateral cluster headaches.

Pain
The pain occurs only on one side of the head, around the eye, particularly behind or above the eye, in the temple. The pain is typically greater than in other headache conditions, including migraines, and is usually described as burning, stabbing, drilling or squeezing. While suicide is rare, those with cluster headaches may experience suicidal thoughts (giving the alternative name "suicide headache" or "suicidal headache").  The term "headache" does not adequately convey the severity of the condition; the disease may be the most painful condition known to medical science.
Dr. Peter Goadsby, Professor of Clinical Neurology at University College London, a leading researcher on the condition has commented:

Other symptoms
The typical symptoms of cluster headache include grouped occurrence and recurrence (cluster) of headache attack, severe unilateral orbital, supraorbital and/or temporal pain. If left untreated, attack frequency may range from one attack every two days to eight attacks per day. Cluster headache attack is accompanied by at least one of the following autonomic symptoms: drooping eyelid, pupil constriction, redness of the conjunctiva, tearing, runny nose and less commonly, facial blushing, swelling, or sweating, typically appearing on the same side of the head as the pain. Similar to a migraine, sensitivity to light (photophobia) or noise (phonophobia) may occur during a CH. Nausea is a rare symptom although it has been reported.

Restlessness (for example, pacing or rocking back and forth) may occur. Secondary effects may include the inability to organize thoughts and plans, physical exhaustion, confusion, agitation, aggressiveness, depression, and anxiety.

People with CH may dread facing another headache and adjust their physical or social activities around a possible future occurrence. Likewise they may seek assistance to accomplish what would otherwise be normal tasks. They may hesitate to make plans because of the regularity, or conversely, the unpredictability of the pain schedule. These factors can lead to generalized anxiety disorders, panic disorder, serious depressive disorders, social withdrawal and isolation.

Cluster headaches have been recently associated with obstructive sleep apnea comorbidity.

Recurrence
Cluster headaches may occasionally be referred to as "alarm clock headache" because of the regularity of their recurrence. CH attacks often awaken individuals from sleep.  Both individual attacks and the cluster grouping can have a metronomic regularity; attacks typically striking at a precise time of day each morning or night. The recurrence of headache cluster grouping may occur more often around solstices, or seasonal changes, sometimes showing circannual periodicity. Conversely, attack frequency may be highly unpredictable, showing no periodicity at all. These observations have prompted researchers to speculate an involvement or dysfunction of the hypothalamus. The hypothalamus controls the body's "biological clock" and circadian rhythm. In episodic cluster headache, attacks occur once or more daily, often at the same time each day for a period of several weeks, followed by a headache-free period lasting weeks, months, or years. Approximately 10–15% of cluster headaches are chronic, with multiple headaches occurring every day for years, sometimes without any remission.

In accordance with the International Headache Society (IHS) diagnostic criteria, cluster headaches occurring in two or more cluster periods, lasting from 7 to 365 days with a pain-free remission of one month or longer between the headache attacks may be classified as episodic. If headache attacks occur for more than a year without pain-free remission of at least one month, the condition is classified as chronic.
Chronic CH both occurs and recurs without any remission periods between cycles; there may be variation in cycles, meaning the frequency and severity of attacks may change without predictability for a period of time. The frequency, severity, and duration of headache attacks experienced by people during these cycles varies between individuals and does not demonstrate complete remission of the episodic form. The condition may change unpredictably from chronic to episodic and from episodic to chronic.

Causes

The cause of cluster headache is unknown. Cluster headaches were historically described as vascular headaches, with the belief that intense pain was caused by dilation of blood vessels which in turn, was thought to create pressure on the trigeminal nerve. The vascular theory has been called into question  and other mechanisms are being considered. The Third Edition of the International Classification of Headache disorders classifies CH as belonging to the trigeminal autonomic cephalalgias.

Nerves
Two nerves are thought to play an important role in CH: the trigeminal nerve and the facial nerve.

Genetics
Cluster headache may run in some families in an autosomal dominant inheritance pattern. People with a first degree relative with the condition are about 14–48 times more likely to develop it themselves, and around 8 to 10% of persons with CH have a positive family history. Several studies have found a higher number of relatives affected among females. Others have suggested these observations may be due to lower numbers of females in these studies. Possible genetic factors warrant further research, current evidence for genetic inheritance is limited.

Genes that are thought to play a role in the disease are the hypocretin/orexin receptor type 2 (HCRTR2), alcohol dehydrogenase 4(ADH4), G protein beta 3 (GNB3), pituitary adenylate cyclase-activating polypeptide type I receptor (ADCYAP1R1), and membrane metalloendopeptidase (MME) genes.

Tobacco smoking
About 65% of persons with CH are, or have been, tobacco smokers. Stopping smoking does not lead to improvement of the condition and CH also occurs in those who have never smoked (e.g. children); it is thought unlikely that smoking is a cause. People with CH may be predisposed to certain traits, including smoking or other lifestyle habits.

Hypothalamus
A review suggests that the suprachiasmatic nucleus of the hypothalamus, which is the major biological clock in the human body, may be involved in cluster headaches, because CH occurs with diurnal and seasonal rhythmicity.

Positron emission tomography (PET) scans indicate the brain areas which are activated during attack only, compared to pain free periods. These pictures show brain areas that are active during pain in yellow/orange color (called "pain matrix"). The area in the center (in all three views) is specifically activated during CH only. The bottom row voxel-based morphometry (VBM) shows structural brain differences between individuals with and without CH; only a portion of the hypothalamus is different.

Diagnosis
Cluster-like head pain may be diagnosed as secondary headache rather than cluster headache.

A detailed oral history aids practitioners in correct differential diagnosis, as there are no confirmatory tests for CH.  A headache diary can be useful in tracking when and where pain occurs, how severe it is, and how long the pain lasts. A record of coping strategies used may help distinguish between headache type; data on frequency, severity and duration of headache attacks are a necessary tool for initial and correct differential diagnosis in headache conditions.

Correct diagnosis presents a challenge as the first CH attack may present where staff are not trained in the diagnosis of rare or complex chronic disease. Experienced ER staff are sometimes trained to detect headache types. While CH attacks themselves are not directly life-threatening, suicide ideation has been observed.

Individuals with CH typically experience diagnostic delay before correct diagnosis. People are often misdiagnosed due to reported neck, tooth, jaw, and sinus symptoms and may unnecessarily endure many years of referral to ear, nose and throat (ENT) specialists for investigation of sinuses; dentists for tooth assessment; chiropractors and manipulative therapists for treatment; or psychiatrists, psychologists, and other medical disciplines before their headaches are correctly diagnosed. Under-recognition of CH by health care professionals is reflected in consistent findings in Europe and the United States that the average time to diagnosis is around seven years.

Differential
Cluster headache may be misdiagnosed as migraine or sinusitis.  Other types of headache are sometimes mistaken for, or may mimic closely, CH. Incorrect terms like "cluster migraine" confuse headache types, confound differential diagnosis and are often the cause of unnecessary diagnostic delay, ultimately delaying appropriate specialist treatment.

Headaches that may be confused with CH include:
 Chronic paroxysmal hemicrania (CPH) is a unilateral headache condition, without the male predominance usually seen in CH. Paroxysmal hemicrania may also be episodic but the episodes of pain seen in CPH are usually shorter than those seen with cluster headaches. CPH typically responds "absolutely" to treatment with the anti-inflammatory drug indomethacin where in most cases CH typically shows no positive indomethacin response, making "Indomethacin response" an important diagnostic tool for specialist practitioners seeking correct differential diagnosis between the conditions.
 Hemicrania continua
 Short-lasting unilateral neuralgiform headache with conjunctival injection and tearing (SUNCT) is a headache syndrome belonging to the group of TACs.
 Trigeminal neuralgia is a unilateral headache syndrome, or "cluster-like" headache.

Prevention
Management for cluster headache is divided into three primary categories: abortive, transitional, and preventive. Preventive treatments are used to reduce or eliminate cluster headache attacks; they are generally used in combination with abortive and transitional techniques.

Verapamil
The recommended first-line preventive therapy is verapamil, a calcium channel blocker. Verapamil was previously underused in people with cluster headache.
Improvement can be seen in an average of 1.7 weeks for episodic CH and 5 weeks for chronic CH when using a dosage of ranged between 160 and 720 mg (mean 240 mg/day). Preventive therapy with verapamil is believed to work because it has an effect on the circadian rhythm and on CGRPs. As CGRP-release is controlled by voltage-gated calcium channels.

Glucocorticoids

Since these compounds are steroids, there is little evidence to support long-term benefits from glucocorticoids, but they may be used until other medications take effect as they appear to be effective at three days. They are generally discontinued after 8–10 days of treatment. Prednisone is given at a starting dose of 60–80 milligrams daily; then it is reduced by 5 milligrams every day. Corticosteroids are also used to break cycles, especially in chronic patients.

Surgery
Nerve stimulators may be an option in the small number of people who do not improve with medications. Two procedures, deep brain stimulation or occipital nerve stimulation, may be useful; early experience shows a benefit in about 60% of cases. It typically takes weeks or months for this benefit to appear. A non-invasive method using transcutaneous electrical nerve stimulation (TENS) is being studied.

A number of surgical procedures, such as a rhizotomy or microvascular decompression, may also be considered, but evidence to support them is limited and there are cases of people whose symptoms worsen after these procedures.

Other
Lithium, methysergide,  and topiramate are recommended alternative treatments, although there is little evidence supporting the use of topiramate or methysergide. This is also true for tianeptine, melatonin, and ergotamine. Valproate, sumatriptan, and oxygen are not recommended as preventive measures. Botulinum toxin injections have shown limited success. Evidence for baclofen, botulinum toxin, and capsaicin is unclear.

Management
There are two primary treatments for acute CH: oxygen and triptans, but they are underused due to misdiagnosis of the syndrome. During bouts of headaches, triggers such as alcohol, nitroglycerine and naps during the day should be avoided.

Oxygen
Oxygen therapy may help to abort attacks, though it does not prevent future episodes. Typically it is given via a non-rebreather mask at 12–15 liters per minute for 15–20 minutes. One review found about 70% of patients improve within 15 minutes. The evidence for effectiveness of 100% oxygen, however, is weak. Hyperbaric oxygen at pressures of ~2 times greater than atmospheric pressure may relieve cluster headaches.

Triptans
The other primarily recommended treatment of acute attacks is subcutaneous or intranasal sumatriptan. Sumatriptan and zolmitriptan have both been shown to improve symptoms during an attack with sumatriptan being superior. Because of the vasoconstrictive side-effect of triptans, they may be contraindicated in people with ischemic heart disease. The vasoconstrictor ergot compounds may be useful, but have not been well studied in acute attacks.

Opioids
The use of opioid medication in management of CH is not recommended and may make headache syndromes worse. Long-term opioid use is associated with well known dependency, addiction, and withdrawal syndromes. Prescription of opioid medication may additionally lead to further delay in differential diagnosis, undertreatment, and mismanagement.

Other
Intranasal lidocaine (sprayed in the ipsilateral nostril) may be an effective treatment with patient resistant to more conventional treatment.

Octreotide administered subcutaneously has been demonstrated to be more effective than placebo for the treatment of acute attacks.

Sub-occipital steroid injections have shown benefit and are recommended for use as a transitional therapy to provide temporary headache relief as more long term prophylactic therapies are instituted.

Epidemiology
Cluster headache affects about 0.1% of the general population at some point in their life. Males are affected about four times more often than females. The condition usually starts between the ages of 20 and 50 years, although it can occur at any age. About one in five of adults reports the onset of cluster headache between 10 and 19 years.

History
The first complete description of cluster headache was given by the London neurologist Wilfred Harris in 1926, who named the disease migrainous neuralgia.  Descriptions of CH date to 1745 and probably earlier.

The condition was originally named Horton's cephalalgia after Bayard Taylor Horton, a US neurologist who postulated the first theory as to their pathogenesis. His original paper describes the severity of the headaches as being able to take normal men and force them to attempt or die by suicide; his 1939 paper said:

CH has alternately been called erythroprosopalgia of Bing, ciliary neuralgia, erythromelalgia of the head, Horton's headache, histaminic cephalalgia, petrosal neuralgia, sphenopalatine neuralgia, vidian neuralgia, Sluder's neuralgia, Sluder's syndrome, and hemicrania angioparalyticia.

Society and culture 
Robert Shapiro, a professor of neurology, says that while cluster headaches are about as common as multiple sclerosis with a similar disability level, as of 2013, the US National Institutes of Health had spent $1.872 billion on research into multiple sclerosis in one decade, but less than $2 million on CH research in 25 years.

Research directions 
Some case reports suggest that ingesting tryptamines such as LSD, psilocybin (as found in hallucinogenic mushrooms), or DMT can abort attacks and interrupt cluster headache cycles. The hallucinogen DMT has a chemical structure that is similar to the triptan sumatriptan, indicating a possible shared mechanism in preventing or stopping migraine and TACs. In a 2006 survey of 53 individuals, 18 of 19 psilocybin users reported extended remission periods. The survey was not a blinded or a controlled study, and was "limited by recall and selection bias". The safety and efficacy of psilocybin is currently being studied in cluster headache.

Fremanezumab, a humanized monoclonal antibody directed against calcitonin gene-related peptides alpha and beta, is in phase 3 clinical trials for CH.

References

Ailments of unknown cause
Headaches
Neurological disorders
Pain management
Wikipedia emergency medicine articles ready to translate
Wikipedia medicine articles ready to translate